Mission Vao is a fictional character and party member in the 2003 action role-playing video game Star Wars: Knights of the Old Republic, developed by BioWare and published by LucasArts. A teenaged blue-skinned member of the Twi'lek species, she is depicted as a kind and resourceful orphaned street child who is the constant companion of a Wookiee named Zalbaar. American actress Catherine Taber started her voice acting career with the role of Mission Vao.

Mission has been well-received as a character; she is noted as an example of a well-rounded female extraterrestrial character in the Star Wars series, and has remained popular as a fan favorite.

Conception and creation

The character originated in pen and paper sessions of West End Games' Star Wars: The Roleplaying Game held by the game's lead designer, James Ohlen. In an interview with Electronic Gaming Monthly, Art Director Derek Watts said Mission has been altered from the character's original concept as a young Twi'lek male who is a teenager or a young adult in his early 20s. It was later decided that the character would be slightly younger, and her personality should be emphasized as a "cute teen" as opposed to a delinquent youth like John Connor in Terminator 2: Judgment Day.

Catherine Taber's role as Mission Vao served as a starting point for her career in the voice acting industry. Taber, a self-described Star Wars fan, noted that the audition for Mission was her career's second, and felt that her enthusiasm for the intellectual property helped her secure the role. She said the role earned her some credibility as a voice actor, which helped her agent during negotiations with casting directors, and she felt fortunate that it opened up more opportunities for the progression of her career.

Taber alluded Mission's dynamic with Zaalbar to the relationship between Han Solo and Chewbacca. She applied her knowledge of Mission's past, which she said gives context into how it shaped her personality as an orphaned child who is alone in the world and wants to appear "cool and tough" to others, as part of her preparation for the character. She occasionally ad-libbed some of the character's mannerisms, including references to other works in the Star Wars universe. For Taber, Mission and other Twi'lek characters she would later portray such as Vette share some inherent traits, which include a "natural optimism in the face of adversity, a "can-do" attitude and especially, an undeniable feistiness". Drawing from her own cultural experiences, Taber opined that the Twi'lek people, who are often portrayed as a marginalized minority in the Star Wars franchise, have a "common cultural thread" to their shared history. She cited the Ryloth arc in The Clone Wars television show as an example which provided insight into the Twi'lek people's history as "one of occupation and hardship, ending with a revolt".

Character
Within the series, Mission Vao is presented as a young and naive but street-smart Twi’lek orphan who lives on the streets of Taris, who is reliant on her Wookiee companion Zaalbar for physical protection or to intimidate others. Mission is presented as having mastered of sleight of hand and slicing techniques, adept at stealth, lockpicking and demolition abilities, and skilled in the use of a blaster and vibroblade.

Appearances

Star Wars: Knights of the Old Republic
Mission is first seen in a Lower City bar on the planet Taris, and is later encountered in its Undercity. She is distraught that her Wookiee companion Zaalbar has been captured by the Gamorrean slavers during a trip into the sewers of the Undercity, and seeks help to rescue Zaalbar. Zaalbar swears fealty to the player character upon his rescue, and both he and Mission join the player character's party as companions for the remainder of the game. Optional conversations with Mission will reveal details about her past and how she and Zaalbar met, and eventually unlocks a subplot side quest involving her brother Griff. Towards the end of the game, if the player character embraces their identity as Darth Revan, Dark Lord of the Sith and sides with a fallen Bastila Shan, Mission and Zaalbar will attempt to defect from the party. The player will have to either kill them, or in the alternative, exploit Zaalbar's life debt and force him to murder Mission on their behalf. If Zaalbar is forced to kill Mission, he will turn on Revan if he is brought along as a companion to the Star Forge.

Other appearances
Mission's past is explored in the twenty-second issue in the Star Wars: Knights of the Old Republic series of comics. Mission has been mentioned in the massively multiplayer online game Star Wars: The Old Republic as well as Star Wars reference books, such as the second volume of The Complete Star Wars Encyclopedia.

Mission Vao and Zaalbar are available as unlockable characters in the mobile game Star Wars: Galaxy of Heroes.

Reception
Mission Vao has received a positive critical reception, and is considered a fan favorite. Catherine Taber noted in a number of interviews that she still received fan mail about Mission years after the release of Star Wars: Knights of the Old Republic. Among the game's cast of characters, she is the favorite companion of Mike Fahey from Kotaku, John Walker from Eurogamer, and Abigail Holden from SA Gamer. Walker in particular praised Mission as "pitch perfect, both over-enthusiastic and endearing while a whining, complaining mess, and horribly over-dependent", and considered her to be "brilliantly written", who is "funny and annoying in equal measure". He formed the view that Mission is "possibly the most notorious character from KOTOR, famously loved or loathed, simply because BioWare did such a splendid job of writing a 14-year-old girl". Valerie Estelle Frankel praised the character as a "cool female Han" who is not presented as a stereotypical Twi'lek sex slave, as well as her visual design of being fully dressed in nondescript colors with vest and goggles like an actual smuggler. Anthony Gramuglia from CBR said the best female characters of the Star Wars franchise are in its licensed video games, and cited Mission as an example. Megan Crouse from Den of Geek praised Mission, a Twi'lek female who is "a street-smart thief who would fit in perfectly with the smugglers and scoundrels of the galaxy", as a nuanced alien character who is not typecast as typical of the Star Wars franchise. In his book Star Wars: Knights of the Old Republic which explored the developmental history of the eponymous game, Alex Kane highlighted an anecdote by BioWare general manager Casey Hudson discussing one of his favorite memories of the game, a conversation with Mission, as an example of the sense of agency that the game afforded players.

Mission has appeared in multiple "top character" lists. Mission is considered by Gamestm to be one of Bioware's eight most memorable party companions. App Trigger ranked Mission No. 9 in their 2017 list of the 10 Best BioWare Companions. Alana Joli Abbott from Den of Geek said she is the most unique character among the "several badass women" in Knights of the Old Republic, and rated her as among the 25 best female characters of the Star Wars media franchise. Mission was included in GameSpot's 2019 list of "15 Great Star Wars Characters Who Came From Video Games".

The decision for players to kill Mission as part of the gameplay experience of roleplaying an evil character has generated discussion. Walker repeatedly expressed regret and reservation about treating Mission badly throughout the game; regarding the act of forcing Zaalbar to murder Mission, he did not think there is a more evil moment, not only in the game but in any other video game. PC Gamer described the act of compelling Zaalbar to murder Mission as "twisted", and one of the most profoundly malevolent player decisions in PC gaming.

References

Bibliography

External links

BioWare characters
Star Wars Legends characters
Star Wars video game characters
Star Wars: Knights of the Old Republic characters
Extraterrestrial characters in video games
Female characters in video games
Fictional criminals in video games
Fictional swordfighters in video games
Science fantasy video game characters
Teenage characters in video games
Video game characters introduced in 2003
Video game sidekicks